is a contemporary Japanese writer. He is one of the best-selling authors in Japan, and the major theme of his novels is about family. His most notable works include Naifu (ナイフ) (1997), Eiji (エイジ) (1999) and Bitamin F (ビタミンF) (2000).

Shigematsu’s works in other genre including journals, editorials and critics are highly commended. He also worked in novelising screenplays.

Biography
Shigematsu was born in Kume, Okayama Prefecture in Japan in 1963. He spent most of his youth in Yamaguchi Prefecture. After he has graduated from Yamaguchi Senior High School in 1981, he went to Tokyo at the age of 18.

Shigematsu's life has changed during his years studying in Waseda University School of Education. Katsumi Togo (東郷 克美 Tōgō Katsumi) was his mentor. Since his third year of study, he worked as an editorial staff for Waseda University's literary journal, Waseda bungaku. At that time, Kenji Nakagami was the mentor of the editorial department. Shigematsu once mentioned that his works showed the influence of Nakagami. In fact, Shigematsu seldom read any books until he became the editorial staff of the journal, and thus he could barely involve in the members' conversation. He therefore every time memorised the names of the writers and titles of the novels they mentioned, and searched in libraries and book stores afterwards. He spent most of his money he got from the scholarship on books and read as much as he could, in the hope that he would be able to join the conversation one day.

After graduating from Waseda University, he worked for Kadokawa Shoten as an editorial writer. He later worked as a freelance writer using over 20 pen names, including Akira Tamura (田村 章 Tamura Akira) and Koshir Okada (岡田 幸四郎 Okada Kōshirō), when he novalised dramas and films, wrote for magazines and sometimes took on ghostwriting works.

In 1991, Shigematsu debut as an author with his first novel, Bifoa Ran (Before Run). He distinguished himself as a young adult writer, focusing on themes including bullying, juvenile crime and domestic problems.

Shigematsu suffered from a speech disorder known as stammering or stuttering when he was young, and he could hardly pronounce words starting with the sound "k", which made him struggled a lot when pronouncing his own name, Kiyoshi. Shigematsu projected his own experience in his novel "Kiyoshiko" (きよしこ) (2002).

In 2007, Shigematsu wrote the lyrics for the theme song, Meguriai, for the 74th The Nationwide Contest of Music sponsored by NHK (secondary division).

Awards
 1999 Naifu (ナイフ) - Tsubota Shōji Literary Prize
 1999 Eiji (エイジ) - 14th Yamamoto Shūgorō Prize
 2000 Bitamin F (ビタミンF) - 124th Naoki Prize
 2001 Jūjika (十字架) - 44th Yoshikawa Eiji Literary Prize
 2006 Sono Hi no Mae ni (その日のまえに) - 3rd Japan Booksellers' Award (5th place)
 2008 Kassiopeia no Oka de (カシオペアの丘で) - 5th Japan Booksellers' Award (10th place)'''
 2014 Zetsumetsu Shōnen (ゼツメツ少年) - 68th Mainichi Shuppan Literary Prize 

Nominations
 1994 Miharitō kara Zutto (見張り塔から　ずっと) - 8th Yamamoto Shūgorō Prize
 1996 Osanago Warera ni Umare (幼な子われらに生まれ) - 18th Yoshikawa Eiji Literary Prize
 1997 Naifu (ナイフ) - 11th Yamamoto Shūgorō Prize
 1998 Teinen Gojira (定年ゴジラ) - 119th Naoki Prize
 2000 Kakashi no Natsuyasumi'' (カカシの夏休み) - 123th Naoki Prize

Works
Novels

1990s

2000s

2010s

References

1963 births
Living people
People from Okinawa Prefecture
Waseda University alumni
20th-century Japanese novelists
21st-century Japanese novelists
Writers from Tokyo
20th-century Japanese male writers
21st-century male writers